The 2008 Challenge Trophy is a soccer competition for men's amateur teams in Canada.  Each province determined their representative in different methods (league or cup). The final competition was held at King George V Park in St. John's, Newfoundland from 8th to 13 October 2008.

Teams
The seeding based on last years performance are:
 AB - Calgary Callies
 BC - Gorge FC
 NL - St. Lawrence Laurentians
 NS - Halifax City Colwell Bankers
 MB - SC Hellas
 ON - Real Toronto
 QC - Corfinium de St-Leonard
 PE - Avondale Islanders
 SK - Yorkton United
 NL (host) - Feildians Ernst & Young Orenda

Qualification
The following is a list of clubs, by province, that have entered their own provincial competition.

British Columbia
Winners of the Senior A Cup will represent BC at the National Championships.  The 2008 Cup will be hosted in the Fraser Valley May 9 and 10.
 Gorge FC

20 teams entered the competition so a 4-game preliminary round was required.

Preliminary Round:
Indo vs Surrey U  (0:2)
Inter vs Vantreights (4:0) 
Columbus v FVSL #5 
Croatia v Firemen (3:2)

Alberta
The ASA hosts a Senior Men's Challenge Trophy from Aug. 29 to Sept. 1 in Calgary.  Winner goes to Nationals. The Alberta Major Soccer League teams are:
 Calgary Callies FC
 Calgary Dinos Major
 Calgary Villains Elite FC
 Lethbridge FC
 Red Deer Renegades
 Edmonton Drillers
 Edmonton Green and Gold
 Edmonton Scottish
 Edmonton Victoria
 Edmonton KC Trojans

Manitoba
The MSA Cup 2008 determines the Manitoba representative to the National Challenge Trophy.  The cup is an FA Cup styled tournament running from May 31 to August 23, 2008.  Various teams enter at various levels and each round to drawn (not a static bracket).  Round 5 is to be drawn on 13 July 2008.  Teams to watch for include:

 Hellas
 Lucania SC
 Sons of Italy Lions SC

Hellas S.C. advance 3-0 on penalty kicks.

Nova Scotia
The rep is determined through the Nova Scotia Soccer League.  This league has teams from PEI and NB but the rep will be the top NS team.
 Halifax City
 Halifax Dunbrack
 Halifax County
 Cape Breton United
 Valley Kings Arms
 Dartmouth United
 Scotia
 Highland

Ontario
The rep is determined through the Ontario Cup. About 60 teams are entered in 2008.  The final 16 teams are detailed below.  Real Toronto wins the title however the result was reversed when a player eligibility infraction occurred.

Newfoundland
The rep will be determined from a final cup competition after a league season.  The final weekend will be held Labour Day weekend at the King George V Park in St. John's.  The Molson Challenge Cup 2008 will be contested by the following teams:
 St. Lawrence Laurentians (defending champion)
 Mount Pearl
 Holy Cross FC
 Feildians
 St. John's U18s (exhibition team)
The St. Lawrence Laurentians defeated Feildians on the final weekend.  Approximately 2500 fans were in attendance.

Final competition
 Official Site
 Host Site

Round robin
The teams will be split into 2 groups of 5 teams each. After round robin, seeding matches will take place (A1vB1, A2vB2, etc.)  New Brunswick dropped out so a second team from the host Newfoundland was entered.

Play-offs

Top goal scorers

Sources

2008
Canadian National Challenge Cup
Nat